Orchestina dentifera is a species of spider of the genus Orchestina. It is endemic to Sri Lanka.

See also 
 List of Oonopidae species

References

Oonopidae
Spiders of Asia
Endemic fauna of Sri Lanka
Arthropods of Sri Lanka
Spiders described in 1893